In set theory, a nice name is used in forcing to impose an upper bound on the number of subsets in the generic model.  It is used in the context of forcing to prove independence results in set theory such as Easton's theorem.

Formal definition

(1) 

(2) For all -names ,  forms an antichain.

(3) (Natural addition): If , then there exists  in  such that .

References

Forcing (mathematics)